The 1996 FIS Ski Jumping Grand Prix was the 3rd Summer Grand Prix season in ski jumping on plastic. Season began on 18 August 1996 in Trondheim, Norway and ended on 1 September 1996 in Stams, Austria.

Other competitive circuits this season included the World Cup and Continental Cup.

Calendar

Men

Standings

Overall

Nations Cup

References

Grand Prix
FIS Grand Prix Ski Jumping